EUREF Permanent Network (EPS) is a European network of more than 300 continuously operating GNSS reference stations with precisely known coordinates referenced to the ETRS89. EPS is the key instrument in the maintenance of ETRS89 geodetic datum. The EPN stations collect continuously the observation data from high accuracy multi-GNSS receivers. The data is processed in the centralized way in a few data processing centres. EPS is created and maintained by a voluntary agreement of about 100 European agencies and universities. EPS activities are coordinated by EUREF.

Structure
The EPS consists of the following components:

Tracking Stations include GNSS tracking receivers and antennae on suitable geodetic markers.
Operational Centres perform data validation, conversion of raw data to the RINEX format, data compression, and upload to Local Data Centres.
Local Data Centres store the data of Tracking Stations and disseminate them via the Internet.
Local Analysis Centres process a subnetwork of EPS stations and deliver weekly subnetwork  solutions to Combination Centres.
Combination Centres combine subnetwork solutions into one official EPS solution, which is weekly sent to the IGS for the integration in the global GNSS network solution.
Central Bureau manages day-to-day the activities of EPS. It is located at the Royal Observatory of Belgium in Brussels.

Data and products
EPS data are raw multi-GNSS pseudorange and phase observations, broadcast ephemerides, and supporting types of raw data (such as meteorological) as they are gathered by the Tracking Stations. The EPS data is available in daily, hourly, 15-min RINEX-formatted files, and for many stations as a real-time data stream via NTRIP.

EPS products include
best-known coordinates of the Tracking Stations in both ETRS89 and ITRS geodetic datums;
time series of the coordinates of the Tracking Stations;
tropospheric zenith path delays at all the Tracking Stations.

References

External links
EPN home page
EPN flyer (quick reference card)
ETRS89 and ITRS Reference coordinates of EPN stations
Time series of the coordinates of the EPN stations
List of all the analysis centres
EPN data and products at BKG
historical EPN data at ROB
BKG NTRIP broadcaster of real-time EPN data
ROB NTRIP broadcaster of real-time EPN data

Geodesy organizations
Satellite navigation
Information technology organizations based in Europe